Andrew Barnes may refer to:

 Andy Barnes (born 1967), English footballer
 Andrew Barnes (businessman) (born 1960), New Zealand-based entrepreneur and philanthropist